Palaquium multiflorum is a tree in the family Sapotaceae. The specific epithet multiflorum means "many flowers".

Description
The bark is reddish brown. The inflorescences bear up to seven flowers.

Distribution and habitat
Palaquium multiflorum is endemic to Borneo, where it is known from Sarawak and Brunei. Its habitat is mostly kerangas forests, occasionally mixed dipterocarp forests.

Conservation
Palaquium multiflorum has been assessed as endangered on the IUCN Red List. The species is threatened by logging and conversion of land for palm oil plantations.

References

multiflorum
Endemic flora of Borneo
Trees of Borneo
Plants described in 1909